Wyatt Earp: Return to Tombstone is a 1994 American Western television film starring Hugh O'Brian as Wyatt Earp, featuring new footage mixed with colorized sequences from O'Brian's 1955–1961 television series The Life and Legend of Wyatt Earp.

The supporting cast for the new footage includes Bruce Boxleitner, Paul Brinegar, Harry Carey, Jr., Bo Hopkins, and Don Meredith.  The colorized flashback archival footage from the original television series features Douglas Fowley as Doc Holliday and Lloyd Corrigan as Ned Buntline.  The movie was directed by Paul Landres and Frank McDonald.

Cast
 Hugh O'Brian as Wyatt Earp
 Bruce Boxleitner as Sheriff Sam, Sheriff of Cochise County
 Paul Brinegar as Jim "Dog" Kelly
 Harry Carey, Jr. as "Digger" Phelps
 Bo Hopkins as "Rattlesnake" Reynolds
 Alex Hyde-White as Woodworth Clum
 Martin Kove as Ed Ross
 Don Meredith as Clay, The Bartender
 Jay Underwood as Jack Montgomery
 Douglas Fowley as John "Doc" Holliday / "Doc" Fabrique (flashback sequences)
 John Anderson as Virgil Earp (flashback sequence)
 Dirk London as Morgan Earp (flashback sequence)
 Rayford Barnes as Joe "Ike" Clanton (flashback sequence)
 Steve Brodie as Sheriff Johnny Behan (flashback sequence)
 Lloyd Corrigan as Ned Buntline (flashback sequence)

References

External links
 Wyatt Earp: Return to Tombstone at the Internet Movie Database
 

1994 television films
1994 films
1990s English-language films
American Western (genre) television films
Cultural depictions of Wyatt Earp
Cultural depictions of Doc Holliday
Films based on television series
Television series reunion films
CBS network films
Films directed by Paul Landres
Films directed by Frank McDonald